Rumbiak is a surname. Notable people with this surname include:

 Ardiles Rumbiak (born 1986), Indonesian football player
 Franklin Rumbiak (born 1989), Indonesian football player
 Imanuel Rumbiak (born 1998), Indonesian football player
 Jacob Rumbiak (born 1958), West Papuan academic and political leader
 John Rumbiak (born 1962), West Papuan human rights and environment activist